Bossiaea obovata is a species of flowering plant in the family Fabaceae and is endemic to eastern Australia. It is a small, low-lying or prostrate shrub with egg-shaped leaves with the narrower end towards the base, and pea-shaped, yellow and red flowers.

Description

Taxonomy and naming
Bossiaea obovata was first formally described in 2012 by Ian R. Thompson in the journal Muelleria from specimens collected near Stanthorpe in 1984. The specific epithet (obovata) means egg-shaped with the widest part above the middle, referring to the shape of the leaves.

Distribution and habitat
This bossiaea grows in open forest and woodland from the Stanthorpe district in Queensland to Werrikimbe National Park in north-eastern New South Wales.

References

obovata
Flora of Queensland
Flora of New South Wales
Plants described in 2012